Han Gan (Chinese: 韩干/韓幹) (c. 706–783) was a Chinese painter during the Tang Dynasty.

He came from a poor family in either Chang'an, modern-day Xi'an, Shaanxi; Lantian, modern-day Shaanxi; or Daliang, modern-day Kaifeng, Henan.  As a young man, Han Gan was recognized by Wang Wei, a prominent poet, who sponsored Han in learning arts. Han became a student of Cao Ba, a court painter. After his studies, Han became a painter in the Tang court.

Han painted many portraits and Buddhistic themed paintings during his career; however, he is most widely remembered for his paintings of horses.  He was reputed to have "learned from the horses in the imperial stables" and to be able to not only portray the physical body of the horse, but also its spirit.  His reputation rose and surpassed that of his teacher.  Horse painters of later generations studied Han.

He is honored with a crater named for him on Mercury.

Gallery

References

External links
 Metmuseum.org - Night-Shining White, a painting by Han Gan

706 births
783 deaths
8th-century Chinese painters
Buddhist artists
Tang dynasty painters